Cheap Day Return can refer to:

A type of train ticket, now known as an Off-Peak Day Return ticket
A song on Aqualung (Jethro Tull album), 1971
Cheap Day Return (novel) by R. F. Delderfield